The River Street Streetcar was a heritage streetcar line in Savannah, Georgia, in the United States. It began regular operation on February 11, 2009, and shuttled between six stops along River Street, next to the Savannah River.  In or around 2015, service was quietly discontinued, with no official notice at the time.  The maintenance and storage tent on the west side of the line was removed along with the streetcar vehicle itself.

History 
The first horsecars began operation in Savannah in 1869. Electric streetcars started operation in 1890 but were discontinued on August 26, 1946. The Norfolk Southern Railway had owned the River Street branch line for years, operating the River Street Rambler, which was a local freight train, until 2003.  

The city of Savannah purchased the River Street Branch line right-of-way from Norfolk Southern in 2004 for approximately $600,000. The streetcar now runs along the abandoned railroad tracks in the cobblestones on River Street east and west of City Hall.

To provide streetcar service a 1930s-era W5-class streetcar (#756), originally from Melbourne, Australia, was purchased by the city for about $207,000 and converted to power its motors with an onboard biodiesel-fueled generator and batteries as a hybrid drive for an additional $100,000. Hence it is a form of diesel railcar. The streetcar was nicknamed "Dottie'" — a reference to the Savannah DOT that completed the project. The service was introduced during the Climate Action Parade on December 9, 2008. Additional free rides were provided for a day on December 13, 2008. Regular operations started on February 11, 2009.  Service was quietly ended after several long-term shutdowns for maintenance.  No formal declaration of abandonment were ever published and the Chatham Area Transit website quietly removed all references to the streetcar sometime in 2015.

The car is currently stored at the Georgia State Railroad Museum.

As of 2017, the discontinuation of the streetcar has been addressed on the Savannah DOT website. "You may have noticed that dottie – the River Street Streetcar – is absent from our website. Early in 2016 we had to make a tough decision to suspend the streetcar operation for the remainder of the year. This decision was made in coordination with staff at the City of Savannah who assist with funding and logistics. The planned construction on the West end of River Street will soon interfere with the streetcar track and facility. We examined several alternatives, but eventually concluded that a temporary suspension of the service was the only viable choice. We look forward to a time when we can announce that streetcar service on River Street will resume."

Schedule and stations 

The streetcar operated Thursday through Sunday from noon to 9:00 pm.

From west to east the station stops along the line are:
 Montgomery Street
 Barnard Street
 City Hall – Transit Terminal connection to city buses and the Savannah Belles ferry 
 Abercorn Street
 Habersham Street
 East Broad Street – connection to the Savannah Belles ferry to Hutchinson Island from Waving Girl Landing

Future expansion 
In the spring of 2009 it was hoped that the operating schedule would be expanded to six days a week and operating hours will be extended hours to 10:00 pm each evening. A second car for the current single-car service would have allowed for operation of a two-car train that would be bidirectional.

Later, the River Street Line may be extended to the city's Georgia State Railroad Museum and Visitor Center, provided that Martin Luther King Jr. Boulevard could have new streetcar tracks laid along it. Other new lines have been planned, which most likely will run on abandoned railroad tracks throughout the city, such as on Fahm Street.

While the River Street Line's streetcar operated on a biodiesel-fueled internal combustion engine, future lines will probably be electrified by overhead wires. Either replica or vintage streetcars could be used for the future extensions. The restoration of Birney Safety Car #656, a single-truck streetcar, is another likelihood.

With the demise of the River Street Line for unknown cause or reasons, future expansion at this time is highly unlikely.

See also 

 Hybrid train
 Georgia State Railroad Museum
 Savannah Historic District

References

External links 

Connect the DOT (official web site)

Heritage streetcar systems
Transportation in Savannah, Georgia
Tourist attractions in Savannah, Georgia
Streetcars in Georgia (U.S. state)
Railway companies established in 2009
Transportation in Chatham County, Georgia
2009 establishments in Georgia (U.S. state)
American companies established in 2009